Internet Archive is a nonprofit organization based in San Francisco, California, United States.

Internet archive may also refer to:
Wayback Machine, digital archive of the World Wide Web maintained by Internet Archive
arXiv, a repository of scientific preprints ("e-prints") available online
Web archiving, archiving of the World Wide Web itself
Marxists Internet Archive

See also
Web archive (disambiguation)

.
Online archives